Roberto Carlos Gutiérrez Gamboa (born 18 April 1983), nicknamed Pájaro (Bird), is a Chilean footballer who plays as a striker for Cobreloa in the Primera B de Chile. He has played in his country and Mexico in his years as professional players.

Gutiérrez made his senior team debut in 2007 and has made 6 appearances, scoring 3 goals.

Club career
Born in Curacaví, a town close to the capital Santiago, Gutiérrez joined Universidad Católica youth set-up aged 12 for be promoted to the first-adult team eight years later by the coach Óscar Meneses in 2003.

In 2005, he was loaned to Deportes Melipilla. In July 2006, Gutiérrez was loaned to the Mexican side Cruz Azul, finally playing with the team affiliation of Oaxaca. He returned to Las Condes' side for play the 2006 Torneo de Clausura, making his re-debut for the club against O'Higgins in a 1–0 away loss.

Gutiérrez made his 2007 Torneo de Apertura debut in a 1–0 home win over Santiago Wanderers, playing the full 90 minutes, and scored his first goal of the season against Lota Schwager on 18 February. With the pass of time, he broke into the first team and was an undisputed starter in the squad of the Peruvian coach José del Solar. On 16 June 2007, he suffered a serious cruciate ligament injury for second time in his career, in the 2–0 victory over Coquimbo Unido for the Apertura's last game, although after a scan it was revealed to be not as bad as first thought, with Católica optimistic that he would return before the early of the next season.

In January 2008, fully recovered of his injury, Gutiérrez signed a four-year contract with the Mexican side UAG Tecos, but he was loaned six months to the pre-cordilleran side for play the Copa Libertadores, remaining of this form in Católica. He returned to play in an 8–2 home win to Santiago Morning for the Torneo de Apertura first week, scoring the last goal in the 87th minute of game. Gutiérrez made his Libertadores debut in the 1–0 win over the Peruvian club Universidad San Martín de Porres, and scored his first goal for this contest in the next game in a 2–1 defeat against River Plate, putting the equalizer goal in the 47th minute. During the season, he appeared in 16 games, scoring in six opportunities.

After his participation in those tournaments with Católica, Gutiérrez joined the club in June 2008. He made his league debut in a 2–0 defeat against the Mexican last champion Santos Laguna, as a 77th-minute substitution. Gutiérrez only made 3 appearances for Tecos in the Torneo de Apertura.

In January 2009, it was revealed that Gutiérrez was loaned to Everton on a six-months deal for newly play the Copa Libertadores. His move to this team was on order from the coach Nelson Acosta. He made his season debut in a 1–0 defeat against Unión Española. The birdie scored the first Libertadores goal of the Acosta era in the 1–0 home win to the Venezolan club Caracas, defining after a great pass of his teammate Ezequiel Miralles.

In July of that year, he returned to Universidad Catolica, scoring 14 goals in 13 matches.

Signed by Colo-Colo for the "Clausura", he scored twice against Santiago Wanderers on 7 July 2011.
After two years in the club, Colo Colo entered into one of its worst crises, and on 27 June 2013, he rescinded his contract with the team.

Career statistics

International career

International goals
Scores and results list Chile's goal tally first.

Honours

Club
Universidad Católica
 Primera División (3): 2010, 2016–C, 2016–A
 Supercopa de Chile (1): 2016
Palestino
Copa Chile (1): 2018

References

External links

1983 births
Living people
People from Melipilla Province
People from Santiago Metropolitan Region
Chilean footballers
Chilean expatriate footballers
Chile international footballers
Chilean Primera División players
Liga Premier de México players
Liga MX players
Segunda División Profesional de Chile players
Club Deportivo Universidad Católica footballers
Deportes Melipilla footballers
Cruz Azul Hidalgo footballers
Tecos F.C. footballers
Everton de Viña del Mar footballers
Colo-Colo footballers
Colo-Colo B footballers
Club Deportivo Palestino footballers
Atlante F.C. footballers
Santiago Wanderers footballers
O'Higgins F.C. footballers
Ñublense footballers
Chilean expatriate sportspeople in Mexico
Chilean expatriates in Mexico
Expatriate footballers in Mexico
Association football forwards